Exec was a company based in San Francisco, United States, that provided companies and individuals access to on-demand personal assistants (for delivery, furniture assembly, research, etc.) and cleaning services. Started by Justin Kan, founder of Justin.tv, in February 2012 with co-founders Daniel Kan, his brother, and Amir Ghazvinian, Exec was backed by Y Combinator and other prominent investors. The company was acquired by Handy in January 2014.

History
Exec received $3.3 million in seed funding. In September 2013, Exec shut down its errand service to focus on its cleaning service . In January 2014, Handybook, a company founded by Oisin Hanrahan, Umang Dua, Ignacio Leonhardt, and Weina Scott in 2012 announced that it had acquired Exec.

Business method
Exec’s errand service had no auction process, and was not an open marketplace. The jobs were dispatched to nearby individuals with the appropriate skills and good ratings, at a flat rate of $38 an hour  .

Reception
Exec was nominated for Techcrunch's 2012 TechCrunchie Award for Fastest Rising Startup. Exec’s cleaning service garnered positive reviews from web publications such as TechCrunch praising their professionalism and efficiency. Exec also received positive coverage by other publications such as The New York Times, Huffington Post, Forbes, Inc., and Business Insider.

References

Online marketplaces of the United States
2014 mergers and acquisitions
Cleaning companies of the United States
Companies based in San Francisco